Garmak (also Romanized as Garmok) is a village in Tabar Rural District, Jolgeh Shoqan District, Jajrom County, North Khorasan Province, Iran. At the 2006 census, its population was 371, in 104 families.

References 

Populated places in Jajrom County